The Delușor (also: Holom or Cuțan) is a left tributary of the river Bâsca in Romania. It flows into the Bâsca near Comandău.

References

Rivers of Romania
Rivers of Covasna County